The 61st edition of the Vuelta a Colombia was held from 12 to 26 June 2011. It was won by the Colombian cyclist Félix Cárdenas.

References

Vuelta a Colombia
Colombia
Vuelta Colombia